Phalanger may refer to:

Marsupials
 Phalanger, a genus of possum in the family Phalangeridae
 Other members of the family Phalangeridae, typically known as brushtail possums and cuscuses
 Gliding possums, also known as flying phalangers
 Various other members of the order Diprotodontia

Other uses
 Phalanger (compiler), a PHP compiler